The Nathan Combs House is a historic house located in Washington County, Arkansas.

Description and history 
Set on a  estate, it is a two-story brick house, built in the late 1860s by one of the region's largest landowners. The house is noted for its dignified Italianate styling, including decorative brackets and a two-story front porch.

The house and its immediate surroundings were listed on the National Register of Historic Places on December 12, 1976.

See also
National Register of Historic Places listings in Washington County, Arkansas

References

Houses on the National Register of Historic Places in Arkansas
Houses in Washington County, Arkansas
National Register of Historic Places in Washington County, Arkansas
Houses completed in 1868
1868 establishments in Arkansas